Operation Innkeeper ("Unternehmen Gastwirt" in German) was an aborted plan devised in Autumn 1941 to send two Irish Abwehr agents to London on a sabotage mission.

One of the two agents was John Codd, an Irish national captured while serving in the British Army in 1940.  While radio and sabotage training for Innkeeper did take place the plan was aborted due to the general collapse of German efforts to train and recruit suitable Irish agents as part of its Friesack Camp experiment.

References

Bibliography 
 Hull, Mark M. (2003). Irish Secrets. German Espionage in Wartime Ireland 1939-1945. .
 Stephan, Enno. (1963). Spies in Ireland. . (Reprint).
J Bowyer Bell. (1997, 3rd Edition). The Secret Army - The IRA. .

See also 
IRA Abwehr World War II - Main article on IRA Nazi links
Friesack Camp

Innkeeper
Innkeeper
Innkeeper
Western European theatre of World War II
1940s in Ireland
Innkeeper
Innkeeper